Heliophisma xanthoptera is a species of moth of the family Erebidae first described by George Hampson in 1910. It is found in Kenya, Mozambique, Tanzania Sierra Leone, South Africa and Zambia.

References

Erebinae
Moths of Africa